Top Class is a British children's television quiz show produced by ITV Studios for CBBC.

Format
Although the competition is open to all state schools, only 16 teams per series make it through the audition stage and proceed to take part. All competitors are in Year 6 in England or Wales, and Primary 7 in Scotland or Northern Ireland.

Each round includes questions taken from the National Curriculum Key Stage 2, starting with a buzzer question. The team which answers correctly takes control of the game and is given a further four questions to answer. The subjects includes Maths, English, Science, History, Geography and News. There is also Test the Teacher, where the class' teacher answers pop-culture questions, and Pet Subjects, where the class chooses a subject to be questioned on. Pet Subjects chosen include CBBC series The Dumping Ground and the 2015 general election.

In series 3, the "Lightning" Round was introduced to start each contest; this features a puzzle, such as a word search or crossword, on two specific subjects, one for each team for a chance to score some points on the board before the subject rounds.

Each contest ends with "The Battle of the Buzzers"; teams have 90 seconds to answer as many quick-fire questions as they can on the buzzer.

Transmissions

Series

Specials

References

External links
 
 
 

2016 British television series debuts
2020 British television series endings
2010s British children's television series
2010s British game shows
2020s British children's television series
2020s British game shows
CBBC shows
BBC children's television shows
BBC high definition shows
BBC television game shows
English-language television shows
Television series by ITV Studios